The men's tournament was held from 28 June to 7 July.

Oleg Stoyanovskiy and Viacheslav Krasilnikov defeated Julius Thole and Clemens Wickler to win the title, while Anders Mol and Christian Sørum captured the bronze medal by beating Tri Bourne and Trevor Crabb.

Qualification
There were 48 teams qualified for the tournament. Normally, the host country obtained two places in the competition as well as the top 23 teams from FIVB World ranking. But, there was a hosted team ranked among the 23 teams, so the next highest ranked team qualified. The next her 20 teams belonged to five continental confederation which got four spots each. The last three spots were appointed by FIVB.

Preliminary round
The draw was held on 4 June 2019.

All times are local (UTC+2).

Pool A

|}

|}

Pool B

|}

|}

Pool C

|}

|}

Pool D

|}

|}

Pool E

|}

|}

Pool F

|}

|}

Pool G

|}

|}

Pool H

|}

|}

Pool I

|}

|}

Pool J

|}

|}

Pool K

|}

|}

Pool L

|}

|}

Ranking of the third place teams
The four best third-placed teams advanced directly to the round of 32. The other eight third-placed teams will play in the lucky losers playoffs for the additional four spots in the Round of 32.

|}

Lucky losers playoffs

|}

Knockout stage

Bracket

Round of 32

|}

Round of 16

|}

Quarterfinals

|}

Semifinals

|}

Bronze medal game

|}

Final

|}

See also
2019 Beach Volleyball World Championships – Women's tournament

References

External links
Official website

Men's